Mikey O'Neill (born 8 June 2004) is an English professional footballer who plays as a midfielder for Grimsby Town, on loan from EFL Championship club Preston North End.
.

Career
O'Neill is a youth product of Preston North End, and signed his first scholarship agreement with the club on 9 July 2020. He made his professional debut with Preston North End in a 2–1 EFL Championship win over Queens Park Rangers on 9 April 2022, coming on as a late sub in the 90th minute.One month later on May 10th O'Neill signed his first professional contract. Following several substitute appearances he made his full debut on 7th January 2023 starting in a 3-1 victory against Huddersfield in the F.A. Cup  at Deepdale.

On 14 January 2023, O'Neill joined EFL League Two side Grimsby Town on loan for the remainder of the 2022-23 season.

Playing style
O'Neill is a creative midfielder who can play as an attacking midfielder, or in a more advanced attacking role. He has experience playing futsal, and is good technically and good with the ball.

References

External links
 

2004 births
Living people
Footballers from Liverpool
English footballers
Preston North End F.C. players
Grimsby Town F.C. players
English Football League players
Association football midfielders